Institut aéronautique Jean Mermoz (IAJM) is a flight training organisation and resourcing services. Professional airline pilots have been trained at IAJM since 1957. Its name is from the French aviator Jean Mermoz.

The school is well known for its aviation books. Published in French, since 2016 the books have also been available in English thanks to a partnership agreement with the École nationale de l'aviation civile (French Civil Aviation University). The first English books were published at the Paris Air Show 2017, in partnership with Airbus. 
The school has an agreement with the aerospace college IPSA for a double-degree Master of Science in aviation / ATPL.

One third of French airline pilots have been trained at Institut Mermoz.

Course structure
The course is in one year. It is during this time that students work to complete the 14 JAA/EASA ATPL theoretical exams.

The 14 ATPL exams are as follows:
Principles of Flight
Aircraft General Knowledge – Systems
Aircraft General Knowledge –- Instrumentation
Human Performance
Meteorology
VFR Communications
IFR Communications
General Navigation
Radio Navigation
Flight Planning
Aircraft Performance
Mass & Balance
Operational Procedures
Air Law

Other courses 
The school also trains private pilots, helicopter pilots and cabin crew.

See also
Orly Airport

References

External links
Official website

Educational institutions established in 1957
1957 establishments in France
Education in Île-de-France
Aviation schools in France